Territorial Assembly elections were held in French Upper Volta on 30 May 1948, with a second round on 20 June. They were the first elections to the new Territorial Assembly, which had been created following the separation of Upper Volta from Ivory Coast the previous year.

Electoral system
The Territorial Assembly had 50 seats, with 10 elected by the First College (French citizens) and 40 by the Second College (non-French citizens). The 1948 elections elected an additional 24 seats; six to the first college and 16 to the second.

Campaign
Governor Albert Mouragues was accused of favouring the Voltaic Union over the African Democratic Rally-affiliated Entente Voltaïque (EV), with some commandants "using strong-arm methods" against the EV candidates, whilst a significant number of EV supporters were imprisoned.

Results

References

1948 elections in Africa
1948 in French Upper Volta
1948
1948
May 1948 events in Africa